This is a list of awards and nominations received by (G)I-dle, a South Korean girl group formed by Cube Entertainment, since their debut in 2018. After debuting with their first lead single "Latata" in May 2018, the group won several rookie awards from various year-end award shows in South Korea such as Asia Artist Awards, Gaon Chart Music Awards, Genie Music Awards, Golden Disc Awards, Korea Popular Music Awards, and Melon Music Awards. 


Awards and nominations

Other accolades

Listicles

Notes

References 

Awards
G)I-dle